The Best Song Written and/or Record for a Film award is annually given by the Guild of Music Supervisors to honor the song records directly created for feature films. It was first given at their sixth annual awards function, and has continued to be ever since.

Winners and nominees

2010s

2020s

References

Film awards for Best Song
Songwriting awards